Riana Scheepers (born 9 December 1957) is an Afrikaans author. She received her PhD from the University of Cape Town. She writes children's books, short fiction, and poetry.

References

External links
Stellenbosch writers' site
Childlit site about Scheepers
Other review of her work

South African children's writers
South African women children's writers
20th-century South African women writers
1957 births
Living people
University of Cape Town alumni